Vanadocene, bis(η5-cyclopentadienyl) vanadium, is the organometallic compound with the formula V(C5H5)2, commonly abbreviated Cp2V. It is a violet crystalline, paramagnetic solid. Vanadocene has relatively limited practical use, but it has been extensively studied.

Structure and bonding 
V(C5H5)2 is a metallocene, a class of organometallic compounds that typically have a metal ion sandwiched between two cyclopentadienyl rings. In the solid state, the molecule has D5d symmetry. The vanadium(II) center resides equidistant between the center of the two cyclopentadienyl rings at a crystallographic center of inversion. The average V-C bond distance is 226 pm. The Cp rings of vanadocene are dynamically disordered at temperatures above 170 K and are only fully ordered at 108 K.

Preparation 
Vanadocene was first prepared in 1954 by Birmingham, Fischer, and Wilkinson via a reduction of vanadocene dichloride with aluminum hydride, after which vanadocene was sublimed in vacuum at 100 ˚C. A modern synthesis of vanadocene that allows production in higher quantities requires treating [V2Cl3(THF)6]2[Zn2Cl6] with cyclopentadienylsodium.
 2 [V2Cl3(THF)6]2[Zn2Cl6]  +  8 NaCp  +  THF   →   4 Cp2V

Properties 
Vanadocene is a reactive molecule. As it only has 15 valence electrons available, it readily reacts with many ligands. With alkynes, for example, it reacts to yield the corresponding vanadium-cyclopropene complexes.

One reaction involves carbon monoxide, leading to an ionic vanadocene derivative when performed in inert atmosphere:
Cp2V  +  V(CO)6   →   [Cp2V(CO)2][V(CO)6]
Vanadocene is readily oxidized to the monocation when treated with a ferrocenium salt in toluene.
VCp2  +  [FeCp2]BR4   →   [VCp2]BR4  +  FeCp2 (R = Ph or 4-C6H4F)
These monocations are extremely air-sensitive and have a redox potential of -1.10 V.

Vanadocene reacts with high pressures of carbon monoxide to give CpV(CO)4.

References 

Metallocenes
Organovanadium compounds
Cyclopentadienyl complexes